Asta (born Asta Evelyn Binnie-Ireland, 13 January 1996) is a singer-songwriter from Cygnet, Tasmania, Australia.

She rose to prominence when her track "My Heart Is On Fire" won Triple J's Unearthed High in 2012. The track went on to be voted into position 50 in the Triple J Hottest 100, 2012. She has gone on to release the singles "Escape" and "I Need Answers", as well as touring Australia nationally.

In 2015, she released the song "Dynamite" featuring Australian rapper Allday, which reached number 66 on the ARIA Singles Chart. She featured as the opening act for British musical act Ellie Goulding in 2015 and featured at music festivals such as The Plot in December 2015, Skullduggery (Adelaide) in February 2016 and Hyperfest (Perth) in February 2017.

In 2016 she released the single "Wild Emotion", and started an Australian Tour for the song starting on 18 March 2016 at Springfield, Queensland. Also in 2016, Asta toured as the opening act for Ellie Goulding again, on the Australian leg of her Delirium Tour. She brought her friend and collaborator Allday on stage during her sets as a surprise guest performer, where he rapped his featured parts of their joint song, "Dynamite".

In February 2017 she released her debut EP, Shine. In March 2017 she embarked on her national Shine Tour to promote the EP.

Her single 'Want You To Know' was released in 2019 to critical acclaim.

Her track released with Mark Maxwell "Santorini" was 'number 1' in the ARIA club Charts for 8 weeks, and over 20 weeks in the top 10 so far.

In February 2023, after a 4 year release hiatus, Asta released new single "Ahhh".

Discography

Extended plays

Singles

As lead artist

As featured artist

References

People from Hobart
Musicians from Tasmania
1994 births
Living people
Australian women pop singers
21st-century Australian women singers
21st-century Australian singers